Danger List is a 1959 British short film directed by Leslie Arliss for Hammer Film Productions. It stars Philip Friend, Honor Blackman and Mervyn Johns. It was photographed by Arthur Grant, and has a score by Edwin Astley. The running time is 22 minutes.

Plot
A nurse in the dispensary of an English hospital is suffering with a migraine, and accidentally dispenses the wrong medicines to three patients. The police and doctors have little time to locate the patients before the consequences are fatal.

All three patients are located. However, the husband (Johns) of the third uses the pills to kill his wife, who is already suffering from a terminal illness, and takes one himself to join her in death.

Cast
 Philip Friend as Dr. Jim Bennett 
 Honor Blackman as Gillian Freeman 
 Mervyn Johns as Mr. Ellis 
 Constance Fraser as Mrs. Ellis 
 Alexander Field as Mr. Carlton 
 Muriel Zillah as Mrs. Coombe 
 Amanda Coxell as Laura Coombe 
 Everley Gregg as Neighbour 
 Pauline Olsen as Young Nurse 
 Jeremy Longhurst as Mobile Policeman 
 Patricia Cree as Audrey

External links 
 
 BFI.org

1959 films
British drama short films
Films directed by Leslie Arliss
Hammer Film Productions films
1950s English-language films